Nancy Fredrika Augusta Edberg (12 November 1832 in Ytterjärna – 11 December 1892 in Stockholm), was a Swedish swimmer, swimming instructor and bath house manager director. She was the first Swedish woman in these fields. Edberg was a pioneer in making the art of swimming and ice skating accepted for women in Sweden

Biography 
Nancy Edberg was taught to swim by her father. At this point, there was little physical education for females, one of few female role models being Gustafva Lindskog, the first instructor in physical education in 1818.

Nancy Edberg was employed as a swimming instructor at the newly founded bath house for women in Stockholm in 1847. This was the first bath house open to women in the nation: first located at Riddarhuset, it was moved to Kastellholmen the following year. In 1851, she was made swimming master at Åbomska simskolan (Åbom Swimming School), and from 1853, she held her own swimming lessons at Djurgården. She was given the license to open her own bath house by King Oscar I of Sweden in 1856, and in 1856-1858, she held public swimming exhibitions at Gjörckes simskola (Gjörcke Swimming School) with her students to finance the opening of her own bath house, likely the first public swimming exhibitions by women in Sweden and, possibly, also Europe. She inaugurated her own bath house in July 1859, and served as its swimming master until 1866.

Louise of the Netherlands, then Queen of Sweden, and her daughter Louise (later Queen of Denmark) were among Edberg's students between 1862 and 1864, assisted by Hilda Petrini. The art of swimming was initially not regarded as being entirely proper for women, but when the Queen and her daughter supported it by attending the lessons, swimming was quickly made fashionable and became accepted for women. The same thing happened when Nancy Edberg introduced lessons in teaching women to ice skate (1864); this was initially considered so improper that a covered fence was put up around the place where the lessons took place to hide the women from public view; but when the queen and her daughter themselves joined the class, ice skating quickly became fashionable and accepted for women, and the fence was pulled down. Among her other students in swimming was the Princess of Wales, Alexandra of Denmark, and the Empress of Russia, Maria Feodorovna (Dagmar of Denmark).

At the swimming exhibition at Gjörckes simskola in Stockholm on 24 August 1864 "Mamsell Nancy Edberg displayed her skill in the art of swimming".

In 1865, she introduced swimming for women in Oslo in Norway, and then travelled to Saint Petersburg in Russia on a scholarship and recommendation from the royal couple to the Russian Emperor and Empress. Edberg introduced swimming for women in Copenhagen, Trondhjem and a multitude of Swedish cities "from Ystad to Östersund". She married the Danish lithographer Carl Andrésen (d. 1873) in 1867.

Nancy Edberg was given a front page biography as a tribute for her pioneer work at the feminist publication Idun in 1890.

Notes

References 
Wilhelmina Stålberg:Anteckningar om svenska qvinnor
Ossian Edmund Borg :Stockholms simsällskaps femtioårsfest 1877
Stockholms Sjögård Maritim kultur: Skepps- och Kastellholmarna
Claës Lundin:Nya Stockholm. (1890)
 Idun (1890): Nr 15 (121)

Image 
Image of Nancy Edberg

Further reading

External links 
 https://news.google.com/newspapers?nid=336&dat=18930127&id=sxYcAAAAIBAJ&sjid=0VUEAAAAIBAJ&pg=7070,50696

Swedish female swimmers
1832 births
1892 deaths
19th-century Swedish people
19th-century sportswomen